The geological features of Charon, the largest moon of Pluto, are being mapped by scientists using data from the New Horizons spacecraft. The team has given provisional names to the most prominent.

, only some of the names have been officially recognized by the International Astronomical Union, which has agreed that names for features on Charon should come from the following:

 Destinations and milestones of fictional space and other exploration.
 Fictional and mythological vessels of space and other exploration.
 Fictional and mythological voyagers, travellers and explorers.
 Authors and artists associated with space exploration, especially Pluto and the Kuiper Belt.

Some features discovered by the New Horizons mission have been given provisional names based on various science fiction and fantasy franchises, including Star Wars, Star Trek, Doctor Who, Alien, Firefly, and Macross. These names remain unofficial until accepted by the IAU.

On 11 April 2018, the IAU announced that several of the feature names had been officially recognized.

Terrae
A terra is an extensive landmass or highland. Charon's only highland region is named after a fictional destination.

Dorsa
A dorsum is a ridge. Charon's only dorsum is named after an author.

Maculae
A macula is a dark spot. Charonian maculae are being named after fictional destinations.

Plana
A planum is a plateau or an elevated plain, Charon's only planum is named after a fictional destination.

Montes
A mons is a mountain. Montes on Charon are being named after authors and artists.

Chasmata
A chasma is a deep, elongated, steep-sided depression. Charonian chasmata are being named after vessels in fiction.

Craters

Craters on Charon are named after characters associated with science fiction and fantasy.

See also
Geology of Charon
List of geological features on Pluto

References

External links 
 Official list of Charon's features (IAU)
 Map of Charon

Charon